The following is a list of female U.S. presidential and vice presidential nominees and invitees. Nominees are candidates nominated or otherwise selected by political parties for particular offices. Listed as nominees or nomination candidates are those women who achieved ballot access in at least one state (or, before the institution of government-printed ballots, had ballots circulated by their parties). They each may have won the nomination of one of the US political parties (either one of the two major parties or one of the third parties), or made the ballot as an Independent, and in either case must have votes in the election to qualify for this list. Exception is made for those few candidates whose parties lost ballot status for additional runs.

History
While many historians and authors agree that Victoria Woodhull was the first woman to run for president, some have questioned the legality of her run. They disagree with classifying it as a true candidacy because she was younger than the constitutionally mandated age of 35, but election coverage by contemporary newspapers does not suggest age was a significant issue. The presidential inauguration was in March 1873, while Woodhull didn't turn 35 until September of that year.

The first woman to receive votes at a national political convention for president or vice president was Quaker activist and orator Lucretia Coffin Mott who received 6% of the votes in the first ballot for the vice president nomination at the 1848 convention of the Liberty Party.

Margaret Chase Smith announced her candidacy for the Republican Party nomination in 1964, becoming the first female candidate for a major party's nomination. She qualified for the ballot in six state primaries, and came in second in the Illinois primary, receiving 25% of the vote. She became the first woman to have her name placed in nomination for the presidency at a major political party's convention.

Charlene Mitchell was the first African American woman to run for president, and the first to receive valid votes in a general election, in 1968. She qualified for the ballot in two states as the nominee of the Communist Party USA, winning 1,075 votes.

In 1972, Shirley Chisholm became the first black candidate for a major party's presidential nomination, and the first woman to run for the Democratic Party's nomination. During this primary, Chisholm won the New Jersey primary, becoming the first woman or African American to win a primary in any state. This would not be repeated by another woman for 36 years, in 2008.

Also in 1972, Tonie Nathan, the Libertarian Party's vice presidential candidate, became the first woman to receive an electoral vote, via faithless elector Roger MacBride. In the 1988 presidential election, Lenora Fulani became the first woman to achieve ballot access in all fifty states. Fulani was also the first African American to do so. Three of her running mates, Joyce Dattner, Mamie Moore (also African American), and Wynonia Burke, also achieved ballot access separately in varying numbers out of the 50 states.

The first woman to become a major party nominee for vice president was Democrat Geraldine Ferraro, in 1984.  The second, and first Republican, was Sarah Palin, in 2008.

In the 2008 Democratic presidential primaries, Senator Hillary Clinton of New York became the first woman to be listed as a presidential candidate in every primary and caucus nationwide. Despite losing the nomination in a close race against Barack Obama, Clinton won more votes in 2008 than any primary candidate in American history.

Former Secretary of State Hillary Clinton became the first woman nominated for president by a major party after winning a majority of pledged delegates in the 2016 Democratic Party primaries, and was formally nominated at the Democratic National Convention on July 26, 2016. As a major party nominee, Clinton became the first woman to participate in a presidential debate, and later the first to carry a state in a general election. Despite losing the election, Clinton became the first woman to win the popular vote, receiving nearly 66 million votes to Donald Trump's 63 million.

The Green Party has run a female candidate three times, Cynthia McKinney in 2008 and Jill Stein in 2012 and 2016. Stein is currently the female candidate with the third-most votes in a general election, having received nearly 1.5 million votes in 2016.

Prior to the 2020 United States presidential election cycle, only five women throughout history had made it to a major party's primary debate stage: Democrats Shirley Chisholm (in 1972), Carol Moseley Braun (in 2004), and Hillary Clinton (in 2008 and 2016), and Republicans Michele Bachmann (in 2012) and Carly Fiorina (in 2016); there had never been more than one woman on the debate stage at one time, and there had never been more than two women running per party at one time. In the 2020 presidential election cycle, a record-breaking six women ran for president in the Democratic Party: Senator Elizabeth Warren of Massachusetts, Senator Kamala Harris of California, Senator Amy Klobuchar of Minnesota, Senator Kirsten Gillibrand of New York, Representative Tulsi Gabbard of Hawaii, and author Marianne Williamson. The initial night of the first Democratic primary debate, which took place on June 26–27, 2019, marked a major milestone, as it featured three women: Warren, Klobuchar, and Gabbard; Harris, Gillibrand, and Williamson participated on the second night.

Jo Jorgensen was the Libertarian Party's presidential candidate for the 2020 election, and is the first woman to be nominated by that party. Jorgensen is currently the female candidate with the second-most votes in a general election, having received nearly 1.9 million votes in 2020.

Kamala Harris is the vice president of the United States. She is the United States' first female vice president and the highest-ranking female elected official in U.S. history. She is also the first Asian-American and the first African-American vice president.

On November 19, 2021, Harris became the first woman to serve as acting president of the United States, when President Joe Biden invoked the third section of the Twenty-fifth Amendment before undergoing a routine medical procedure. Harris was acting president from 10:10 a.m. until 11:35 a.m. 

In popular culture, many tv shows, novels, films, and other media show a female as a president of the United States.

Presidential candidates

Candidates who received electoral college votes

General election candidates by popular vote
This list, sorted by the number of votes received, includes female candidates who have competed for President of the United States in a general election and received over 40,000 votes.

† Popular vote winner

Primary election candidates
This list, sorted by the number of votes received, includes female candidates who have sought their party's presidential nomination in at least one primary or caucus and received over 5,000 votes. 
 Party nominee

All candidates

Party nominees

Not nominated by party 
Candidates who failed to receive their parties' nomination.

Vice presidential candidates

Candidates who received electoral college votes
  Elected Vice President

By popular vote
This list includes female candidates who have run for Vice President of the United States and received over 100,000 votes. Note that the vote for vice president is not separate in the United States and is identical to that for the presidential nominees.
 Elected Vice President

All candidates

Party nominees

Not nominated by party

See also 
 List of elected and appointed female heads of state and government
 List of female governors in the United States
 Edith Wilson (sometimes nicknamed "the first female president of the United States")

References

External links 
 Freeman, Jo,  The Women Who Ran for President (2007)
 Maurer, Elizabeth. "First but Not the Last: Women who Ran for President". National Women's History Museum. 2016.

 
 
Lists of American female politicians
Female vice-presidential candidates